The Advantage-studio, created in 1987, is a French independent production company, specialising in producing documentaries with themes including: nature, the animal world and contemporary societies, either as full producer or as executive producer. Advantage-studio documentaries are regularly broadcast on French television.

Current projects 
Advantage-studio's current projects include:
Adoption, des chaînes et des passions: a 52-minute documentary film about international adoption
Militsia au jour le jour: a 52-minute documentary film about the Russian police
Russian Ballets: a 52-minute documentary film about the life of a Russian dance ballet troupe

Recent filmography 
Nouvelle-Zélande, une île nature (52 minutes)
L'homme qui a vu le lynx (15 minutes)
Carnets éthiopiens (52 minutes)
Excès de z'ailes (52 minutes)
Hors-piste dans les Andes (52 minutes)
Uyuni, aux bons soins d'Éole (26 minutes)
Dans le cochon ... (52 minutes)
Tout un fromage (52 minutes)
Demain la Taïga (52 minutes)
De Retour de St. Pétersbourg (52 minutes)
Le cerf : un décor pour 2 destins (52 minutes)
La grive : voyages et ramages (52 minutes)

External links 

Film production companies of France